The National Union of Students Scotland is an autonomous body within the National Union of Students.  It is the national representative body of around 500,000 students studying in further and higher education in Scotland and was formed following the merger of NUS in Scotland with the Scottish Union of Students in 1971.

As of 2020, the President of NUS Scotland is the sole full-time elected officer and is elected for a two-year term. The current President is Ellie Gomersall.

Affiliated Students' Unions
Students' associations in Scotland which are affiliated to NUS:

Higher Education
 University of Aberdeen
 University of Abertay Dundee
 University of Edinburgh
 Glasgow Caledonian University
 Heriot-Watt University
 Edinburgh Napier University
 Open University
 Royal Conservatoire of Scotland
 The Robert Gordon University
 Stirling University
 University of Strathclyde
 University of the West of Scotland

Further Education
 Ayrshire College
 Borders College
 City of Glasgow College
 Dumfries and Galloway College
 Dundee and Angus College
 Edinburgh College
 Fife College
 Forth Valley College
 Glasgow Clyde College

 Glasgow Kelvin College
 New College Lanarkshire
 North East Scotland College
 South Lanarkshire College
 West College Scotland
 West Lothian College

Tertiary Education:

 University of the Highlands and Islands
 Scotland's Rural College

NUS Scotland Officers

The full list of past officers of NUS Scotland are as follows:

NUS Scotland Chairpersons & Presidents

NUS Scotland Depute Presidents & Vice Presidents Education (2002–19)

NUS Scotland Women's Officer (1992–2020)

NUS Scotland Vice President Communities (2012–20)

See also 
Equivalent autonomous bodies within National Union of Students of the United Kingdom:
 NUS Wales (UCMC)
 NUS-USI (Northern Ireland)
National organisation:
 National Union of Students

References

External links 
 NUS Scotland section of NUS home page
 NUS internal resource site for elected officers and students
 NUS Extra Card

Scotland
 
Groups of students' unions
Higher education in Scotland
Organisations based in Edinburgh
1922 establishments in Scotland
Student organizations established in 1922